Juan Pujol (born 28 May 1952) is a Spanish former racing cyclist. He finished 10th in the 1976 Giro d'Italia and rode in the 1978 Tour de France.

References

External links
 

1952 births
Living people
Spanish male cyclists
Place of birth missing (living people)
Sportspeople from Terrassa
Cyclists from Catalonia